The Saints are a group of villages in the north of the English county of Suffolk, between the rivers Blyth and Waveney near to the border with Norfolk.  The villages are all named after a saint (that of their parish church), and either South Elmham or Ilketshall named after the 'hall of Alfkethill'. Known by locals as 'up the Parishes' the area is found between the market towns of Halesworth, Harleston, Bungay and Beccles.

The Saints are:
All Saints' South Elmham
St Cross South Elmham (also known as Sancroft St George, and Sancroft).
St James South Elmham
St Margaret South Elmham
St Mary, South Elmham (also known as Homersfield)
St Michael South Elmham
St Nicholas South Elmham (church no longer present)
St Peter South Elmham
Ilketshall St Andrew
Ilketshall St John
Ilketshall St Lawrence
Ilketshall St Margaret
Flixton is generally grouped within the Saints

Each of the villages also constitutes a civil parish, apart from All Saints and St Nicholas, which are joined together in the All Saints and St Nicholas, South Elmham parish. St Michael is one of the Thankful Villages.

It is unclear whether North Elmham in Norfolk or South Elmham in Suffolk is the site of East Anglia's second See ("Helmham"), founded in the reign of King Ealdwulf (c.664-713) according to Bede.

The Saints is the setting for much of Michael Ondaatje's Warlight, a mystery set in the 1950s in which the area is described as having a unique culture.

Governance
An electoral ward of Waveney District Council with the same name exists. The population of this ward taken at the 2011 Census was 2,242.

References

External links
The Saints from suffolkchurches.co.uk
The Mystery of the two Elmhams

Geography of Suffolk
Waveney District